Sam Lane may refer to:

Sam Lane (comics), character that has appeared in DC Comics publications
Sam Lane (rugby union) (born 1991), Australian rugby union player
Sam Lane (field hockey) (born 1997), New Zealand field hockey player

See also
Samantha Lane (born 1979), Australian journalist
Samuel Lane (disambiguation)